Sanggai Ibemhal Chanu Maimom (born 3 January 1981 in Bashikong, near Imphal, Manipur) is a female field hockey player from India, who made her international debut for her native country in April 1998 in a friendly against Germany (0–2). She played as a midfielder or as a centre forward. At the 2001 World Cup Qualifier she was named Young Player of the Tournament.

International senior tournaments
 1998 – World Cup, Utrecht (12th)
 1998 – Commonwealth Games, Kuala Lumpur (4th)
 2001 – World Cup Qualifier, Amiens/Abbeville (7th)
 2002 – Champions Challenge, Johannesburg (3rd)
 2002 – Commonwealth Games, Manchester (1st)
 2002 – Asian Games, Busan (4th)
 2003 – Field hockey at the 2003 Afro-Asian Games, Hyderabad (1st)
 2004 – Asia Cup, New Delhi (1st)
 2006 – Commonwealth Games, Melbourne (2nd)
 2006 – World Cup, Madrid (11th)

External links
 Profile on Bharatiyahockey
Commonwealth Games Biography

1981 births
Living people
Indian female field hockey players
Field hockey players at the 1998 Commonwealth Games
Field hockey players at the 2002 Commonwealth Games
Field hockey players at the 2006 Commonwealth Games
Commonwealth Games gold medallists for India
Commonwealth Games silver medallists for India
Commonwealth Games medallists in field hockey
Field hockey players at the 2002 Asian Games
Field hockey players from Manipur
Sportswomen from Manipur
21st-century Indian women
21st-century Indian people
Asian Games competitors for India
Medallists at the 2002 Commonwealth Games
Medallists at the 2006 Commonwealth Games